The Green Hollow (or Aberfan: The Green Hollow) is a "film-poem", which was broadcast by the BBC on 21 October 2016 to mark the fiftieth anniversary of the Aberfan disaster of 1966. Owen Sheers wrote the script of the screenplay using the words of survivors of the disaster whom he interviewed over a period.

Sheers described The Green Hollow as “a film poem in the voice of Aberfan, both then and now”. The work falls into three sections: “Children”, “Rescuers” and “Survivors”. Actors who participated in the film, reading in the authentic voices of those who witnessed the disaster, included Michael Sheen, Jonathan Pryce, Siân Phillips, Eve Myles, Robert Pugh and Iwan Rheon, and the film was directed by Pip Broughton. Sheers said that he had at first been doubtful about the project because he did not want to exploit the grief of the local community. He later concluded that "I realized that this small community had become defined by the disaster and I wanted to show what the place was like before that."

The poem was published in book form by Faber & Faber in 2018. Sheers said that the incremental sense of menace in the book was "a feeling that’s got stronger with its eventual publication ... because of the physical entity of the book".

References

2016 television films
2016 films